Central Suffolk and North Ipswich is a constituency represented in the House of Commons of the UK Parliament since 2010 by Dan Poulter, a Conservative.

History
The county constituency was formed for the 1997 general election, largely from eastern parts of the abolished constituency of Central Suffolk, including the north-western wards of the Borough of Ipswich. Also included western fringes of Suffolk Coastal.

Sir Michael Lord, knighted in 2001, who had held the predecessor seat of Central Suffolk, was the first MP who served the seat, from 1997 until 2010.  The 2010 general election saw the fourth win for a Conservative with the election of Dan Poulter, who retained the seat at the 2015 and 2017 elections.

Constituency profile 
Central Suffolk and North Ipswich is a safe seat for the Conservative Party, primarily made up of rural farming communities and retirement properties. The exception to this are the three wards from Ipswich Borough Council, which polarise support between the Conservatives and Labour, and Kesgrave, a new satellite town, which shows strong support for the Conservatives. The rural areas which make up the majority of the constituency, consistently return a majority of Conservative councillors. The local government make up of the seat, in respect  of the number of borough and district councillors elected by party is 27 Conservative, 5 Labour, 4 Independent, 3 Liberal Democrat, and 2 Green. (Barking by-election 2016 was a Green gain).

Boundaries and boundary changes 

1997–2010: The District of Mid Suffolk wards of Barham, Barking, Bramford, Claydon, Creeting, Debenham, Eye, Fressingfield, Helmingham, Hoxne, Mendlesham, Palgrave, Stonham, Stradbroke, Wetheringsett, Weybread, and Worlingworth, the District of Suffolk Coastal wards of Bealings, Dennington, Earl Soham, Framlingham, Glemham, Grundisburgh and Witnesham, Hasketon, Kesgrave, Otley, Rushmere, and Wickham Market, and the Borough of Ipswich wards of Broom Hill, Castle Hill, Whitehouse, and Whitton.

2010–present: The District of Mid Suffolk wards of Barking and Somersham, Bramford and Blakenham, Claydon and Barham, Debenham, Eye, Fressingfield, Helmingham and Coddenham, Hoxne, Mendlesham, Palgrave, Stradbroke and Laxfield, The Stonhams, Wetheringsett, and Worlingworth, the District of Suffolk Coastal wards of Earl Soham, Framlingham, Grundisburgh, Hacheston, Kesgrave East, Kesgrave West, Otley, Rushmere St Andrew, Wickham Market, and Witnesham, and the Borough of Ipswich wards of Castle Hill, Whitehouse, and Whitton.

Lost the Borough of Ipswich ward of Broom Hill which had been abolished by a revision of the borough wards; area covered by the ward now included in the borough constituency of Ipswich. Other marginal changes due to revision of local authority wards.

Members of Parliament

Elections

Elections in the 2010s

Elections in the 2000s

Elections in the 1990s

See also 
 List of parliamentary constituencies in Suffolk

Notes

References

External links 
nomis Constituency Profile for Central Suffolk and North Ipswich — presenting data from the ONS annual population survey and other official statistics.

Parliamentary constituencies in Suffolk
Constituencies of the Parliament of the United Kingdom established in 1997
Politics of Ipswich